Qari Fayyaz-ur-Rehman Alvi is a Pakistani politician who had been a member of the National Assembly of Pakistan from 2002 to 2007. He also founded Darul Qurra at Namak Mandi, Peshawar and served as first Mohtamim.

References

1946 births
Living people
Pashtun people
Pakistani MNAs 2002–2007
Jamiat Ulema-e-Islam (F) politicians
People from Mansehra District
Al-Azhar University alumni
Pakistani expatriates in Egypt